is a Japanese model and television personality. She gained fame in Japan and overseas in September 2010 when she announced on her blog that she had been assigned male at birth.

TV appearances
 Don! (NTV), 21 September 2010
  (NTV), 22 September 2010

Books
 Re-born, Kodansha, 23 June 2011,

References

External links
 Asia Promotion agency profile 
 Covergirl Entertainment agency profile 
 Official blog 
 
 

1988 births
Japanese female models
Transgender female models
Living people
Japanese transgender people
Japanese television personalities